John Frederick Davidson (May 3, 1908 – January 21, 1989) was a rear admiral in the United States Navy. He was Superintendent of the United States Naval Academy in Annapolis, Maryland from June 22, 1960 to August 18, 1962. He was a 1929 graduate of the Naval Academy.

References

Superintendents of the United States Naval Academy
United States Navy rear admirals
1908 births
1989 deaths
20th-century American academics